William Jackson Galbraith (September 15, 1906 – August 9, 1994) was a Rear Admiral in the United States Navy, gymnast and Olympic medalist in the 1932 Summer Olympics. He competed at the 1932 Summer Olympics in Los Angeles where he won a silver medal in  rope climbing.

References

External links
 

1906 births
1994 deaths
People from Knoxville, Tennessee
American male artistic gymnasts
Gymnasts at the 1932 Summer Olympics
Olympic silver medalists for the United States in gymnastics
Medalists at the 1932 Summer Olympics